Aphantes is a genus of moths in the family Geometridae. It was described by David Stephen Fletcher in 1979.

Species
 Aphantes melanochorda (Turner, 1919)

References
 

Nacophorini
Geometridae genera